Juan Ernesto Calderón (born April 29, 2004) is an American soccer player who plays as a winger for USL Championship club LA Galaxy II via the LA Galaxy academy.

Club career
Calderón played as part of the LA Galaxy academy. In 2021, Calderón joined the club's USL Championship affiliate side LA Galaxy II. He made his debut for Galaxy II on July 17, 2021, appearing as an 80th-minute substitute during a 5–0 loss to Phoenix Rising.

Career statistics

Club

References

2004 births
Living people
American soccer players
Association football forwards
LA Galaxy II players
USL Championship players
Soccer players from Riverside, California